Enannatum I , son of Akurgal, succeeded his brother E-anna-tum as Ensi (ruler, king) of Lagash.  During his rule, Umma once more asserted independence under its ensi Ur-Lumma, who attacked Lagash unsuccessfully. After several battles, En-an-na-túm I finally defeated Ur-Lumma. Ur-Lumma was replaced by a priest-king, Illi, who also attacked Lagash.

Enannatum had a son named Meannesi, who is known for dedicating a statue for the life of his father and mother. He has two other sons, Lummatur, and Entemena, the latter succeeding him to the throne. His wife was named Ashumen.

References

Kings of Lagash
25th-century BC Sumerian kings